Christian Brunner (born 2 April 1953) is a former Swiss cyclist. He competed in the 1000m time trial and team pursuit events at the 1972 Summer Olympics.

References

External links
 

1953 births
Living people
Swiss male cyclists
Olympic cyclists of Switzerland
Cyclists at the 1972 Summer Olympics
Place of birth missing (living people)